A paste (empanada/Inglesa in other Latinamerican countries: Argentina and Guatemala, UK diaspora 1880s) is a small pastry produced in the state of Hidalgo in central Mexico and in the surrounding area. They are stuffed with a variety of fillings including potatoes and ground beef, apples, pineapple, sweetened rice, or other typical Mexican ingredients, such as tinga and mole. The paste has its roots in the Cornish pasty introduced by miners and builders from Cornwall, United Kingdom who were contracted in the towns of Mineral del Monte (Real del Monte) and Pachuca in Hidalgo starting in 1824.

Differences from empanadas
Unlike empanadas, but like the Cornish pasty, the filling ingredients for pastes are not cooked before they are wrapped in the pastry casing. Additionally, while empanadas are a light, flaky, leavened pastry containing several layers of dough, pastes use a firm and thin layer of dough.

Festival
The International Pasty Festival is held in Real del Monte for three days each October.

See also

Cornish emigration to Mexico
 List of pastries
 List of stuffed dishes

References

External links
 Historic links between Cornwall UK and the Pachuca/Real del Monte area in Hidalgo, Mexico
 

Mexican cuisine
Savoury pies
Stuffed dishes
Hidalgo (state)